Samseong-Dong is an affluent neighborhood or ward of Gangnam-gu in Seoul, South Korea.

The area has a large concentration of upscale shopping malls, popular restaurants and hotels such as the Ramada Seoul Hotel and the Hyatt Park Hotel. Samseong-dong is also home to some nightclubs. Apart from its nightlife, the COEX mall, the world's largest underground shopping mall, is located in Samseong-dong.

It consists of a large apartment complex and a general residential area, and the 56,000-pyeong Seonjeongneung is loved as a resting place for local residents, including a walk.

History
March 1, 1914 Gyeonggi-do District extension (Samseong-ri, Eonju-myeon, Gwangju-gun, Gyeonggi-do)
January 1, 1963 Merged from Gyeonggi-do to Sudo-dong, Eonju Branch Office, Seoul
May 18, 1970 Sudo-dong renamed as Cheongdam-dong
September 1, 1977 Divided from Cheongdam-dong into Samseong-dong
September 1, 1985 Samseong-dong divided into Samseong-1-dong, Samseong-2-dong

Schools

Samseong-1-dong
Seoul Bongeun Elementary School
Bongeun Middle School
Gyeonggi High School

Samsung-2-dong
Seoul Samneung Elementary School
Eonju Middle School

Attractions
 World Trade Center Seoul
 COEX Convention & Exhibition Center
 Kimchi Field Museum
 Bongeun Temple
 Baekam Art Hall

Education
Schools located in Samseong-dong:
 Bongeun Elementary School
 Samreung Elementary School
 Bongeun Middle School
 Eonju Middle School
 Kyunggi High School
 Seoul Jungae School

Transport
There are two main transportation methods, subway, and bus.
Seoul Subway Line 2
Samseong Station
Seoul Subway Line 9
Bongeunsa Station
Seonjeongneung Station
Bundang Line
Seonjeongneung Station
Samsung Joongang Station
Yeongdong Highway

See also

POSCO
Dong of Gangnam-gu

References

External links
 Samseong-dong official homepage 

Neighbourhoods in Gangnam District